John Patrick Ruffo (born 8 March 1988) is an Australian singer, songwriter, dancer, actor and television presenter notable for being a finalist on the third season of The X Factor Australia in 2011. He placed third in the competition and subsequently signed a recording contract with Sony Music Australia. In 2012, Ruffo won the twelfth season of Dancing with the Stars Australia. His debut single "On Top", released in June 2012, peaked at number 14 on the ARIA Singles Chart and was certified platinum. Ruffo starred in the Australian soap opera Home and Away as Chris Harrington for three years from 2013 to 2016.

Biography

Early life
Johnny Ruffo was born in Balcatta, a suburb of Perth, Western Australia, to parents Jill and Pascoe Ruffo. Ruffo's parents separated when he was three years-old. He spent most of his youth living in a small Homeswest unit with his mother. At the age of 12, Ruffo began pursuing his dream in music, following in the footsteps of his idol, Michael Jackson. He also taught himself how to play the guitar and piano, and wrote his first song at the age of 14. Ruffo was educated at Balcatta Senior High School. Before entering The X Factor, he worked as a concreter and got into the business thanks to his father who works in the trade. Ruffo also performed around Perth with electropop band, Supanova.

2011: The X Factor Australia
Ruffo successfully auditioned for the third season of The X Factor Australia in 2011, singing Jay Sean's "Do You Remember". He eventually reached the live shows and was mentored by Guy Sebastian. On 22 November 2011, it was announced that Ruffo placed third in the competition, while fellow contestant Reece Mastin was announced as the winner.

Ruffo performed the following songs on The X Factor:

Performances on The X Factor

2011–2014: record deal, Dancing with the Stars and Home and Away
Shortly after the completion of The X Factor, Ruffo told News Limited on 30 November 2011 that he was offered a record deal with a major record label, whose name he was not allowed to confirm at the time. He also revealed that he had already recorded several new tracks, stating "I've been in the studio in Perth recording some singles, quite a few different tracks so we can get the right one out there for my first release. The songs are very much my style, which is pop, R&B, mainstream sort of stuff". In December 2011, Ruffo told Take 40 Australia that he had recorded a duet with his X Factor mentor Guy Sebastian. On 16 December 2011, he co-hosted the radio program Nova's Fresh Hits with Gawndy on Nova FM. On 20 December 2011, Ruffo performed at the Melbourne State Library as part of the Optus Celebrity Carols initiative to raise money for World Vision Australia.

In January 2012, Ruffo revealed via his official Twitter account that he was working on his debut album in New York City. He was a supporting act for Reece Mastin's first headlining national tour in Adelaide on 28, 29 and 31 January. In March 2012, it was revealed that the record label Ruffo had signed with was Sony Music Australia. The following month, he became a celebrity contestant on the twelfth season of Dancing with the Stars and was partnered with professional dancer Luda Kroitor. Later that month, Ruffo was a supporting act for One Direction's Australian leg of their Up All Night Tour. On 18 April 2012, Ruffo was announced as the runner-up of Cleo magazine's 2012 Bachelor of the Year contest. In May 2012, he was a supporting act for New Kids on the Block and Backstreet Boys' Australian leg of their NKOTBSB Tour.

Ruffo's debut single "On Top" was released on 15 June 2012. The song peaked at number 14 on the ARIA Singles Chart and was certified platinum by the Australian Recording Industry Association (ARIA), denoting shipments of 70,000 copies. Ruffo was announced as the winner of Dancing with the Stars on 17 June 2012. His winnings from the show were donated to the Youth Off The Streets charity. In September 2012, Ruffo joined the live shows of the fourth season of The X Factor as the host of the digital live streaming show, The X Stream. His second single "Take It Home" was released on 19 October 2012, and reached number 30 on the ARIA Singles Chart.

In April 2013, Ruffo made his acting debut in the Australian television soap opera Home and Away as Chris Harrington. He was initially contracted to appear in 16 episodes, but this was later extended. Ruffo's third single "Untouchable" was released on 12 July 2013, and debuted at number 39 on the ARIA Singles Chart.

2015–2016: Independent Artist: "She Got That O" and "White Christmas"
In May 2015, Ruffo released his fourth single "She Got That O". It was released independently, but failed to chart. On 11 December 2015, Ruffo released a Christmas single, a cover of "White Christmas". On 27 April 2016, Channel 7 announced through their Twitter account that Ruffo had left Home and Away to pursue new challenges. Ruffo stated, "I've loved my time in Summer Bay. There's a lot more coming up for Chris and I hope fans continue enjoying his time on screen." Ruffo's final episode of Home and Away screened on 22 September 2016. On 10 May 2016, it was announced that Ruffo would be featuring in the Channel Nine miniseries, House of Bond, about former WA businessman Alan Bond, to be filmed in Perth and Sydney. House of Bond aired on 24 and 25 April 2017.

2017–present: Brain tumour, "Broken Glass" & "Let's Get Lost"
On 10 August 2017, it was announced that Ruffo had undergone surgery to remove a brain tumour, which was discovered after he went to the hospital suffering from a migraine. Ruffo posted post-surgery photos on his social media accounts asking fans to "keep him in their thoughts". A week later, Ruffo confirmed that he had been diagnosed with brain cancer and would begin aggressive treatment as soon as possible.

During a radio interview in May 2019, Ruffo told Fitzy & Wippa that he was "currently clear of cancer". In June 2019, Ruffo released his first new single in four years titled, "Broken Glass". Ruffo told Channel 7 "This song is probably the most vulnerable song I've written. It's very personal for me. It's loosely about my experiences in the past two or three years – and about being down and out – not necessarily about cancer, but about anything like depression or losing a loved one." In November 2020, Ruffo announced via Instagram that his brain cancer had returned.

In June 2021, Ruffo confirmed his cancer is "now stable". He released a single "Let's Get Lost" which Ruffo told The Morning Show is inspired by wanting to "pack up the car and get lost, just get away from everything for a while... the whole rigmarole of medication and chemotherapy, the stress of all of that."

In September 2022, Johnny said that he wanted to make it until Christmas.

Influences
Ruffo cites Michael Jackson, Usher and Justin Timberlake as his musical influences because they have led him to combine his love for singing and dancing.

Tours
Supporting act
Reece Mastin's Australian Tour (2012)
One Direction's Up All Night Tour: Australian leg (2012)
New Kids on the Block and Backstreet Boys' NKOTBSB Tour: Australian leg (2012)

Discography

Singles

Album appearances

Music videos

Filmography

Awards and nominations

References

External links

 
 
 
 
 
 

1988 births
Australian people of Italian descent
Australian male dancers
Australian pop singers
Australian contemporary R&B singers
Australian singer-songwriters
Musicians from Perth, Western Australia
The X Factor (Australian TV series) contestants
Dancing with the Stars (Australian TV series) winners
Living people
21st-century Australian singers
21st-century Australian male singers
Australian male singer-songwriters